The following is the list of the literacy rate by states of Mexico as of 2005 and 2000.

Mexican states

References

Literacy rate
Mexico
Education in Mexico
Mexico, literacy